The Big 12 Conference women's basketball tournament is the championship women's basketball tournament in the Big 12 Conference.  It is a single-elimination tournament of four rounds, with the top four seeds getting byes in the first round until 2011.  Beginning in 2012 the bottom four teams play First Round games to advance to the Quarterfinals against the top six teams.

Seeding is based on regular season records. The Tournament has been held every year since 1997, except in 2020 when it was cancelled due to the coronavirus pandemic.

The tournament is set to be held at the Municipal Auditorium in Kansas City, Missouri until 2025. It was announced on June 2, 2022, the Big 12 announced that it has agreed to extend its contract to keep the women's tournament in Kansas City until 2027.

Champions
Tournament champions receive an automatic bid to the year's NCAA Women's Division I Basketball Championship.  Numbers in parentheses refer to each team's finish/seed in the tournament for that year.

By school
Tournament record by school through the 2023 tournament. Former conference members are in italics.

Championship game results by team

Italic=Former conference Members

See also

 Southwest Conference women's basketball tournament
 Big 12 men's basketball tournament
 NCAA Division I women's basketball tournament

References

External links
 Official website